James Milton Campbell Jr. (September 7, 1934 – August 4, 2005), better known as Little Milton, was an American blues singer and guitarist, best known for his number-one R&B single "We're Gonna Make It". His other hits include "Baby, I Love You", "Who's Cheating Who?", and "Grits Ain't Groceries (All Around The World)".

A native of the Mississippi Delta, Milton began his recording career in 1953 at Sun Records before relocating to St. Louis and co-founding Bobbin Records in 1958. It wasn't until Milton signed to Checker Records that he achieved success on the charts. Other labels Milton recorded for include Meteor, Stax, Glades, Golden Ear, MCA, and Malaco. Milton was inducted into the Blues Hall of Fame in 1988.

Biography
Milton was born James Milton Campbell Jr. on September 7, 1934 in Inverness, Mississippi. He was raised in Greenville, Mississippi by a farmer and local blues musician. By age twelve he was a street musician, chiefly influenced by T-Bone Walker and his blues and rock and roll contemporaries. He joined the Rhythm Aces in the early part of the 1950s, a three piece band who played throughout the Mississippi Delta area. One of the members was Eddie Cusic who taught Milton to play the guitar. In 1951, Milton recorded several sides backing pianist Willie Love for Trumpet Records.

In 1953, while still a teenager playing in local bars, he was discovered by Ike Turner, who was a talent scout for Sam Phillips at Sun Records. Milton signed a contract with the label and recorded a number of singles. None of them broke through onto radio or sold well at record stores, so Milton left the Sun label in 1955. The next two years he released singles on Modern Records' subsidiary, Meteor Records.

In 1958, Milton moved to East St. Louis and set up the St. Louis-based Bobbin Records label, which ultimately scored a distribution deal with Leonard Chess' Chess Records. As a record producer, Milton helped bring artists such as Albert King and Fontella Bass to fame, while experiencing his own success for the first time. After a number of small format and regional hits, his 1962 single, "So Mean to Me," broke onto the Billboard R&B chart, eventually peaking at #14.

Following a short break to tour, managing other acts, and spending time recording new material, he returned to music in 1965 with a more polished sound, similar to that of B.B. King. After the ill-received "Blind Man" (R&B: #86), he released back-to-back hit singles. The first, "We're Gonna Make It," a blues-infused soul song, topped the R&B chart and broke through onto Top 40 radio, a format then dominated largely by white artists. He followed the song with #4 R&B hit "Who's Cheating Who?" All three songs were featured on his album, We're Gonna Make It, released that summer.

Milton's song "Let Me Down Easy" was recorded by the Spencer Davis Group on The Second Album (1965), but his authorship was not acknowledged on the record. He released a single of it himself in 1968 on Checker. It was also chosen by Etta James as the final track in her final album The Dreamer in 2011.

Throughout the late 1960s Milton released a number of moderately successful singles, but did not issue a further album until 1969, with Grits Ain't Groceries featuring his hit of the same name, as well as "Just a Little Bit" and "Baby, I Love You". With the death of Leonard Chess the same year, Milton's distributor, Checker Records fell into disarray, and Milton joined the Stax label two years later. Adding complex orchestration to his works, Milton scored hits with "That's What Love Will Make You Do" and "What It Is" from his live album, What It Is: Live at Montreux. He appeared in the documentary film, Wattstax, which was released in 1973. Stax, however, had been losing money since late in the previous decade and was forced into bankruptcy in 1975.

After leaving Stax, Milton struggled to maintain a career, moving first to Evidence, then the MCA imprint Mobile Fidelity Records, before finding a home at the independent record label, Malaco Records, where he received his second GRAMMY nomination for "Welcome To Little Milton" in 1999. He remained with the label for much of the remainder of his career. His last hit single, "Age Ain't Nothin' But a Number," was released in 1983 from the album of the same name. In 1988, Milton was inducted into the Blues Hall of Fame and won a W.C. Handy Award. His final album, Think of Me, was released in May 2005 on the Telarc imprint, and included writing and guitar on three songs by Peter Shoulder of the UK-based blues-rock trio Winterville.

Milton died at the age of 70 on August 4, 2005 from complications following a stroke. He was posthumously honored with a marker on the Mississippi Blues Trail in Inverness.

Discography

Albums

Compilation albums 
Greatest Hits (1972, Chess)
Chess Blues Masters Series (1976, Chess) 2-LP
His Greatest Sides Vol. 1 (1983, Chess)
The Sun Masters (1990, Rounder)
Welcome to the Club: The Essential Chess Recordings (1994, MCA/Chess) 2-CD
The Complete Stax Singles (1994, Fantasy)
Stand By Me: The Blues Collection [#48] (1995, Orbis)
Little Milton's Greatest Hits (1995, Malaco)
Rockin' the Blues (1996, MCA Special Products)
Greatest Hits (The Chess 50th Anniversary Collection) (1997, MCA/Chess)
Chess Blues Guitar (Two Decades of Killer Fretwork 1949 to 1969) [various artists] (1998 MCA/Chess) 2-CD
Count the Days (1997, 601 Records)
The Complete Checker Hit Singles (2001, Connoisseur Collection)
Anthology 1953-1961 (2002, Varèse Sarabande)
Running Wild Blues (2006, Charly)
Stax Profiles: Little Milton (2006, Stax)
The Very Best of Little Milton (2007, Stax)
Chicago Blues and Soul via Memphis and St. Louis (2014, Jasmine)

note: this is just a partial list

Appearances on other albums
Jackie Ross: Take the Weight Off Me (Grapevine) – Milton sings five duets with Ross
Albert King, Chico Hamilton, Little Milton: Montreux Festival (Stax, 1974) – a shared-album with King and Hamilton
 Various artists: Vanthology: Tribute to Van Morrison (Evidence, 2004) – Milton covered Van Morrison's "Tupelo Honey"
 Jean Jacques Milteau: Memphis (Sunnyside) – Milton covered Sting's "If You Love Somebody Set Them Free"
E.C. Scott: The Other Side of Me (Black Bud) – Milton sings two duets with Scott
Gov't Mule:
The Deep End, Volume 1 – Milton sings "Soulshine" with Warren Haynes
Mulennium – live album [3-CD, 4-LP] (Evil Teen, 2010) recorded December 31, 1999 at the Roxy Theatre, Atlanta, Georgia
Wintertime Blues: Benefit Concert - a various artists performance from the 'Warren Haynes Christmas Jam' - December 22, 1999
Willie Dixon: The Chess Box – Milton performed "I Can't Quit You Baby"
Ike Turner: That Kat Sure Could Play! The Singles 1951-1957  (Secret Records 2010) – Milton performs on six songs

Singles

References

External links
 Official Little Milton website including biography
  Discography; complete with original catalogue issue numbers
 Official Little Milton store

1934 births
2005 deaths
African-American guitarists
20th-century African-American male singers
American blues guitarists
American male guitarists
American blues singers
Blues musicians from Mississippi
Stax Records artists
Sun Records artists
Checker Records artists
Chess Records artists
Meteor Records artists
Bobbin Records artists
MCA Records artists
Malaco Records artists
Musicians from Memphis, Tennessee
Musicians from Greenville, Mississippi
People from Inverness, Mississippi
Soul-blues musicians
20th-century American singers
21st-century American singers
20th-century American guitarists
21st-century American guitarists
Guitarists from Mississippi
Guitarists from Tennessee
20th-century American male singers
21st-century American male singers
Mississippi Blues Trail
21st-century African-American male singers